The Bela Crkva massacre was the mass-killing of Kosovo Albanian villagers from Bellacërkë, Kosovo by Yugoslav armed forces on 24–25 March 1999.

Twelve hours after NATO had started bombing strategic Yugoslav targets, Yugoslav armed forces came to the area around Bela Crkva, fired artillery, and set fire to the village.

Villagers fled to the river bank and some hid under a bridge. Yugoslav forces found the villagers and divided them into two groups; men and women. ("Men" includes boys aged twelve and above). The men were stripped; their money, valuables, and documents taken; then they were executed. A smaller number of women were killed too. The youngest was four years old.

58 villagers were killed in the massacre. The British Foreign Secretary at the time, Robin Cook, said, "these children cannot conceivably have been a danger to anyone, but the Serb forces clearly saw every Albanian of whatever age as an enemy."

Human Rights Watch suggests that there were similar mass killings in other villages in the district, including Mala Kruša, Celina, and Piranë. However, eyewitnesses are rare, partly due to the efficient and systematic nature of the killings.

References

See also
 War crimes in the Kosovo War
 List of massacres in the Kosovo War

Serbian war crimes in the Kosovo War
1999 in Kosovo
Massacres in 1999
Massacres of men
Massacres in the Kosovo War
Anti-Albanian sentiment
Massacres in Kosovo
March 1999 events in Europe
Violence against men in Europe